Anrei Hakulinen (born February 8, 1990) is a Finnish ice hockey player. He is currently playing as captain with Lukko in the Finnish Liiga.

Playing career
Hakulinen made his Liiga debut playing with Lahti Pelicans during the 2014–15 Liiga season.
In 2019–20 Liiga season, as the team's top players, he was Included helped KooKoo qualify for the playoffs for the first time in the club's history, but Hakulinen had to leave the end of the season after being injured.

Personal life
Hakulinen's father Markku played over 200 SM-Liiga games and was also a member of the Finland men's national team at the Ice hockey at the Lake Placid Olympic Games in 1980. However, he died when Anrei was only eight months old. Anrei's uncles Yrjö Hakulinen and Raimo Ruusunen also played hockey at the SM-liiga level.

References

External links

1990 births
Living people
Finnish ice hockey forwards
Lahti Pelicans players
Lukko players
KooKoo players
Sportspeople from Turku
TuTo players